The 1946 Louisville Municipal Bantams football team was an American football team that represented Louisville Municipal College (now known as Simmons College of Kentucky) as an independent during the 1946 college football season. In their first season under head coach Dwight T. Reed, the Bantams compiled a 5–2 record, lost to Tennessee A&I in the Vulcan Bowl, and outscored all opponents by a total of 116 to 63.

In December 1946, The Pittsburgh Courier applied the Dickinson System to the black college teams and rated Louisville Municipal at No. 16.

The team played its home games at Maxwell Field in Louisville, Kentucky.

Schedule

References

Louisville Municipal
Louisville Municipal Bantams football seasons
Louisville Municipal Bantams football